Neslihan Kavas (born 29 August 1987 in Eskişehir, Turkey) is a Turkish female para table tennis player of class 9 and Paralympian.

She represented Turkey at the 2008 Summer Paralympics, and won bronze by defeating Poland's Malgorzata Grzelak, three sets to nil (11–7, 11–4, 13–11).

Kavas took part at the 2012 Summer Paralympics and advanced to the final, at which she won the silver medal losing 2–3 to Chinese Lei Lina, champion of the 2008 Summer Paralympics. Furthermore, she was part of the Turkish team, which became silver medalist in the women's team class 6–10 event after losing to the team from China in the final.

She won the gold medal in the women's single class 9 division at the 2013 ITTF European Para-Table Tennis Championships held in Lignano, Italy.

Achievements

Notes

1987 births
Turkish female table tennis players
Table tennis players at the 2008 Summer Paralympics
Table tennis players at the 2012 Summer Paralympics
Table tennis players at the 2016 Summer Paralympics
Paralympic table tennis players of Turkey
Medalists at the 2008 Summer Paralympics
Medalists at the 2012 Summer Paralympics
Paralympic medalists in table tennis
Paralympic bronze medalists for Turkey
Paralympic silver medalists for Turkey
Sportspeople from Eskişehir
Living people
Table tennis players at the 2020 Summer Paralympics
20th-century Turkish sportswomen
21st-century Turkish sportswomen